Hellinsia bawana is a moth of the family Pterophoridae. It is known from Yemen.

References

bawana
Insects of the Arabian Peninsula
Moths described in 2010